The Indo-Pacific slender worm-eel (Scolecenchelys gymnota, also known as the Slender worm eel) is an eel in the family Ophichthidae (worm/snake eels). It was described by Pieter Bleeker in 1857. It is a marine, tropical eel which is known from the Indo-Pacific, including the Red Sea, East Africa, the Line Islands, the Society Islands, Johnston Island, Japan, Rapa Iti, Micronesia, and the southern Great Barrier Reef. It forms burrows in inshore sediments of loose gravel and sand.

References

Fish described in 1857
Scolecenchelys